Ester Vilarrubla Escales (born 1965), is an Andorran politician and educator, who is serving as Minister of Education and Higher Education in the government of Xavier Espot since 22 May 2019.

Born in La Seu d'Urgell, Catalonia, Spain, Vilarrubla studied Education at Ramon Llull University, in Barcelona. She was a Catalan language teacher between 1985 and 1991 in Barcelona, between 1991 and 2011 in Andorra. In the 2015 Andorran local elections she won a seat on the Andorra la Vella city council, representing Democrats for Andorra.

References

1965 births
Living people
Andorran women in politics
Women government ministers of Andorra
University Ramon Llull alumni
People from La Seu d'Urgell
Spanish emigrants to Andorra
Andorran people of Spanish descent
Andorran people of Catalan descent
21st-century women politicians
Democrats for Andorra politicians